Nasonovia ribisnigri is a species of aphid. Their primary hosts are currant plants, including blackcurrants (Ribes nigrum) and gooseberries (Ribes uva-crispa), while the secondary hosts are a wider range of plants, including members of the Compositae (Hieracium, Lapsana, Crepis, Leontodon, Lactuca and Cichorium), Lamiales (Veronica and Euphrasia) and Solanaceae (Nicotiana and Petunia). They are an important agricultural pest in lettuce and endive cultivation. 

References

Macrosiphini
Insects described in 1841
Hemiptera of Europe